The Rommel Papers is the collected writings by the German World War II field marshal Erwin Rommel published in 1953.

Background and publication
The book included Rommel's writings of the war, edited by the British journalist and historian B. H. Liddell Hart, the former Wehrmacht officer Fritz Bayerlein, who served on Rommel's staff in North Africa, and Rommel's widow and son. The volume contained an introduction and commentary by Liddell Hart. 

Liddell Hart had a personal interest in the work: by having coaxed Rommel's widow to include material favourable to himself, he could present Rommel as his "pupil" when it came to mobile armoured warfare. Thus, Liddell Hart's "theory of indirect approach" became a precursor to the German blitzkrieg ("lightning war"). The controversy was described by the political scientist John Mearsheimer in his work The Weight of History, who concluded that, by "putting words in the mouths of German Generals and manipulating history", Liddell Hart was in a position to show that he had been at the root of the dramatic German successes in 1940.

Reception
The historian Mark Connelly argues that The Rommel Papers was one of the two foundational works that lead to a "Rommel renaissance" and "Anglophone rehabilitation", the other being Desmond Young's biography, Rommel: The Desert Fox. The book contributed to the perception of Rommel as a brilliant commander; in an introduction, Liddell Hart drew comparisons between Rommel and Lawrence of Arabia, "two masters of desert warfare."

Editions

References

Citations

Bibliography

Further reading
 
 
  
 

World War II memoirs
1953 non-fiction books
German non-fiction books
Propaganda legends
Erwin Rommel